Adolf (Hermann) Lohse (30 August 1807 in Berlin – 15 January 1867) was a Prussian master builder and architect. He was a student of Karl Friedrich Schinkel and one of his projects was the Schloss Albrechtsberg in Dresden.

1807 births
1867 deaths
Architects from Berlin
19th-century German architects